Harold Williams (born August 1, 1970) is an American music video director, film director, film producer, and screenwriter.

Early life
Williams was born in Queens, New York. He is of mixed African-American and Honduran descent. He attended Adelphi University. He first displayed his work by tagging local billboards, storefronts, and playgrounds using HYPE as his graffiti tag. His graffiti style was influenced by artists like Keith Haring and Jean-Michel Basquiat. His big break came when he began working with Classic Concepts Video Productions. Lionel "Vid Kid" Martin and VJ Ralph McDaniels created Williams' first opportunity with the Filmmakers With Attitude moniker (FWA), which was Williams' first video company.

Career

Music videos
Awards Williams has received for his video work include the Billboard Music Video Award for Best Director of the Year (1996), the Jackson Limo Award for Best Rap Video of the Year (1996) for Busta Rhymes' "Woo Hah!! Got You All in Check", the NAACP Image Award (1997), the 8th annual Music Video Production Association Award for Black Music Achievement (1997), MTV Video Music Award in the Best Rap Video (1998) category for Will Smith's "Gettin' Jiggy wit It", MTV Video Music Award for Best Group Video (1999) for TLC's "No Scrubs", and the BET Award for Best Director (2006) for Kanye West's "Gold Digger". In 2006, Williams was honored by MTV with its Michael Jackson Video Vanguard Award, presented in honor of his achievements as a filmmaker.

In the December 2007 issue of Playboy magazine, Williams shot the photographs for cover subject Kim Kardashian.

In 2008, Williams directed Kanye West's video for "Heartless". He also directed the music video for his single "All of the Lights", which premiered on February 19, 2011.

As of 2014, Kanye West holds the artist record for working the most times with Williams; the two have collaborated on 20 music videos, beginning in 2005 with the music video for "Diamonds from Sierra Leone". Busta Rhymes is second behind West, collaborating with Williams on 16 music videos, beginning with debut solo music video "Everything Remains Raw" / "Woo Hah!! Got You All in Check".

Feature and short films
In 1998, he directed his first and so far his only feature film to date, Belly, starring rappers Nas and DMX, the film released by Artisan Entertainment. In 1999, Williams signed a two-year overall deal with New Line Cinema to produce and direct feature films. His first film with New Line, Mothership, died in development. Later that year, Williams was in negotiations with MTV to develop an animated series which was described as a behind-the-scenes look at the world of music and celebrities. The project also died in development.

In 2000, Williams was hired to direct the Warner Bros. film Speed Racer. He left the project the following year, with the film being released in 2008 under the direction of The Wachowskis.

In 2003, Disney purchased the zombie horror film Thrilla, which Williams wrote. The project died in development, with Gavin Polone attached to produce.

In 2010, Williams was the writer for the Kanye West-directed short film Runaway.

Styles
A signature style used by Williams throughout the vast majority of his videos (shot mostly with cinematographer John Perez) was the Fisheye lens which distorted the camera view around the central focus. This was used by the tandem Williams/Perez in "Gimme Some More" by Busta Rhymes and "The Rain (Supa Dupa Fly)" by Missy Elliott; however, it was dropped by 2003, when he experienced his lowest level of production activity since the beginning of his career as a music video director.

Another "signature style" involves placing shots in regular widescreen ratio, while a second shot is split and placed in the upper and lower bars. Videos that use this style include "Diamonds on My Neck" by Smitty, "I Ain't Heard of That" by Slim Thug, "So Sick" by Ne-Yo, "My Hood" by Young Jeezy, "Gomenasai" by t.A.T.u., "Check on It" by Beyoncé, "Freeze" by LL Cool J, "Snap Yo Fingers" by Lil Jon and many others. In addition to this, he frequently utilizes aerial and tracking shots which often move backwards or forwards, some techniques which can often be seen in "Rock the Boat" by Aaliyah, "She's a Bitch" by Missy Elliott, "Not Myself Tonight" by Christina Aguilera and "Only U" by Ashanti. Further style traits include the use of slow motion action, deep focus, and smooth cutting.

Since 2003, Williams has accepted a signature style combining a center camera focus on the artist or actor's body from the torso upward and a solid color background with a soft different-colored light being shown in the center of the background, so as to give a sense of illumination of the background by the foreground subject. This has been displayed in "Gold Digger" by Kanye West, "Digital Girl" (Remix) by Jamie Foxx, "Video Phone" by Beyoncé, and “Barbie Dreams” by Nicki Minaj.

Videography

References

External links
 
 
 Hype Williams  at mvdbase.com
 Hype Williams at Clipland

Adelphi University alumni
African-American film directors
American music video directors
American people of Honduran descent
American male screenwriters
Living people
People from Queens, New York
1970 births
Film directors from New York (state)
People involved in plagiarism controversies
Film directors from New York City
Screenwriters from New York (state)
21st-century African-American people
20th-century African-American people